NASAMS (Norwegian Advanced Surface-to-Air Missile System, also known as the National Advanced Surface-to-Air Missile System) is a distributed and networked short- to medium-range ground-based air defense system developed by Kongsberg Defence & Aerospace (KDA) and Raytheon. The system defends against unmanned aerial vehicles (UAVs), helicopters, cruise missiles, unmanned combat aerial vehicles (UCAVs), and fixed wing aircraft, firing any of a wide range of existing missiles.

NASAMS was the first application of a surface-launched AIM-120 AMRAAM (Advanced Medium Range Air-to-Air Missile). NASAMS 2 is an upgraded version of the system capable of using Link 16, which has been operational since 2007. , NASAMS 3 is the latest upgrade; deployed in 2019, it adds capability to fire AIM-9 Sidewinder and IRIS-T SLS short-range missiles and AMRAAM-ER extended-range missiles, and introduces mobile air-liftable launchers. NASAMS has proven interoperability with longer range systems such as Patriot.

Development 
Development of NASAMS began in the 1980s when Kongsberg Defence & Aerospace (KDA) teamed up with Hughes Missile Systems and Hughes Aircraft Ground Systems Group and initiated the program as a cooperative effort for the Royal Norwegian Air Force (RNoAF). As originally envisioned, NASAMS would replace two Nike Hercules facilities in defending Norway's southern air bases, where it would act in conjunction with F-16s in providing a layered defense.

The integrated air defense battle management command and control system, based on KS500F computers and the KMC9000 control console with two color CRT displays, was first developed for the Norwegian Adapted Hawk (NOAH) program, an upgrade to the MIM-23B Improved Hawk semi-active radar head, surface-to-air missile system. This command and control system integrated existing AN/MPQ-64 High Power Illuminator Doppler Radar (HPIR) with AN/TPQ-36 counter-battery radar, modified into a three-dimensional low-attitude airspace surveillance radar with the TPQ-36A software upgrade.

The upgraded NOAH would still engage only one target per launcher pad, which was insufficient to counter the emerging threat of massive firing of cruise missiles. Thus RNoAF ordered further development of a distributed, network-centric air defense system with multiple launchers and radars.

The MIM-23B missile was replaced with the active radar homing AIM-120 AMRAAM missile, which also uses an inertial navigation system during initial approach, and the TPQ-36A radar was upgraded to the rotating AN/MPQ-64 Sentinel configuration. Test launches were performed in June 1993; the system had an initial operational capability in late 1994 – early 1995, and was fully operationally fielded in 1998.

An enhanced NASAMS 2 was developed in the 2000s and became operational in 2006, while a third generation, NASAMS 3, was developed in the 2010s and fielded in 2019.

First generation NASAMS 

The system integrates US-built TPQ-36A air defense X band 3D radar and AMRAAM missiles with a Norwegian developed battle management C4I (command, control, communication, computers and intelligence) system called FDC, short for Fire Distribution Center. The FDC connected to a radar forms an "Acquisition Radar and Control System" (ARCS). NASAMS capabilities are enhanced by the system's networked and distributed nature. The shelter module hosts two identical consoles for the Tactical Control Officer (TCO) and the Tactical Control Assistant (TCA).

The AMRAAM missile is fired from a towed launcher with six missile canisters. The standard AMRAAM missile has a horizontal range of up to 25 km. Other sources cite a range of "over 15 km" and 40 km for the extended range version.

By the late 1990s, RNoAF formed an integrated ground-based air defense system known as the Norwegian Solution (NORSOL), by connecting NASAMS battle management ARCS stations with two other air defense systems via field wires and radio. Subordinate weapon systems included the RBS 70 laser beam assisted MANPADS system and the Bofors 40mm L70 gun (controlled by the Oerlikon Contraves FCS2000 monopulse doppler tracking radar). The solution integrated all three systems (NASAMS, RBS70, and L70/FCS200) to provide battlefield awareness to commanders of all echelons, and to ensure protection of friendly aircraft while preventing overkill (i.e. engagement of a single threat by multiple air-defense units) and underkill (failure to engage the threat by any unit).

NASAMS 2 

The RNoAF together with KDA conducted a mid-life update of NASAMS in the early 2000s, called NASAMS 2, and the upgraded version was first handed over to RNoAF in mid-2006. The major difference between the two versions is the use of standard tactical data links (Link 16, Link 11, JREAP, ATDL-1 etc.), as well as a better ground radar. Full operational capability (FOC) was expected for 2007.

A complete NASAMS 2 battery consists of up to four firing units; each firing unit includes 3 missile launchers (LCHR) each carrying six AIM-120 AMRAAM missiles, one AN/MPQ-64F1 Improved Sentinel radar, one Fire Distribution Center vehicle, and one electro-optical camera vehicle (MSP500).

The Improved Sentinel radar has a broader frequency spectrum, variable rotation speed, and increased capacity to detect and follow targets. The radar platform comes with its own power supply and can be mounted on a variety of vehicles. Each radar can process and distribute the data independently, and can be connected via radio links, cable, through Multi Rolle Radio, or through TADKOM.

The MSP500 electro-optical sensor from Rheinmetall is equipped with a laser rangefinder and a TV camera, as well as an upgraded thermographic camera. These can be used to fire the missiles passively, which has been successfully tested.

Fire Distribution Centers (FDCs) can form a network with geographically distributed sensors and use either centralised or distributed data fusion to process radar tracks and form a complete airspace picture for the Tactical Control Officer (TCO). Each command post includes two color displays with a task-based common tactical operation control (CTOC) interface. The control system can detach itself from the sensors in order to become less visible.

Operators can switch to a centralized control role by running operation center software (GBADOC). An optional Tactical Control Center (TCC) vehicle, similar to the Batallion Operations Center (BOC) for the Hawk XXI upgrade, includes a third command post which can be used for this role.

The control modules can be mounted on a large variety of vehicles. Each module can automatically determine its position using electronic northfinder and GPS receiver.

NASAMS 3 

In April 2019, RNoAF fielded the upgraded NASAMS 3 system; in May 2019, the first live firing tests were conducted.

NASAMS 3 comes with updated Fire Distribution Center station, an "ADX" console that has ergonomic control surfaces and three 30" flat-panel displays. The redesigned Mk 2 canister launcher can fire AIM-9X Sidewinder Block II short-range missiles and AMRAAM-ER missiles from its launching rails, in addition to AIM-120 AMRAAM. AMRAAM-ER is an extended range upgrade based on Evolved Sea Sparrow Missile rocket motor paired with two-stage AMRAAM guidance head, expanding its engagement envelope with a 50 percent increase in maximum range and 70 percent increase in maximum altitude, giving a maximum range of about 50 km. The extended range missile will have greater ability to take down fast flying and hard-maneuvering targets. In May 2019 the AIM-9X Block II was test fired from NASAMS launchers at the Andøya Space Center in Norway.

By 2019, a new short-range 'Mobile Ground Based Air Defense System' configuration had been developed, intended for initial deployment with Brigade Nord of the Norwegian Army. Each battery includes six mobile short-range IRIS-T missiles that can utilize either IRIS-T SLS missile launchers mounted on tracked vehicles or the three-wheeled M1152A1 HMMWV-based High Mobility Launcher (HML) for the AIM-120 AMRAAM which were originally developed for the U.S. Army SLAMRAAM project and can be air-lifted by C-130 Hercules or C-17 Globemaster. The High Mobility Launcher is capable of launching both AIM-120 and AIM-9X from its four launching rails, and can be equipped with two additional rails. IRIS-T launchers and support vehicles will be based on Armoured Combat Support Vehicle (ACSV) and upgraded M113 (M577A2) command vehicles, and will be equipped with XENTA-M X-band radars designed by Weibel Scientific.

In June 2019, Australia ordered a locally made version of NASAMS 3 with CEA tactical (CEATAC) and towed CEA operational (CEAOPS) AESA radars, High Mobility Launchers and radar carries built on Hawkei PMV vehicles instead of HMMWV, and Fire Distribution Center shelters produced at the Raytheon Australia's facility at Mawson Lakes. The system also includes Raytheon AN/AAS-52 Multispectral Targeting System (MTS)-A, an electro-optical/infrared (EO/IR) guidance system with a high resolution day/night imaging sensor, and integrated laser rangefinder. The ADF plans to spend A$2.5 billion on its NASAMS-based air-defence network.

In October 2021, Raytheon announced that NASAMS 3 will be upgraded with GhostEye MR, a new medium-range S-band AESA radar based on GhostEye (formerly LTAMDS) technology developed for the MIM-104 Patriot system. In March 2022, Raytheon demonstrated that the High Energy Laser Weapon System (HELWS) can be paired with NASAMS to destroy a swarm of drone targets.

Missiles

The AMRAAM is one of the most widely used air-to-air missiles in the world, and stockpiles of it are higher than any other comparable system. As NASAMS uses existing air-to-air missiles such as the AIM-9 Sidewinder, AMRAAM, and AMRAAM-ER, there may be thousands of older missiles in NATO's arsenal that can be fired from a NASAMS battery without change. The AIM-9X variant includes an internal cooling system, eliminating the need for launch-rail nitrogen supply required by older variants of the missile.

A report has described NASAMS as "extremely well suited to Ukraine because of the massive numbers of missiles that NATO and allies can supply, specifically for the air defence system." In particular, older AMRAAM A and B models have been replaced, making available many older missiles which could be sent to Ukraine. For example the UK government has offered to donate "[h]undreds of additional air defence missiles" including the AMRAAMs.

Service history 
In the US, several NASAMS were used to guard air space over Washington, D.C. during the 2005 United States presidential inauguration, and are used to protect air space around the White House.

In 2017, Lithuania ordered the NASAMS-3 to improve its own air defense capabilities; two batteries were delivered in 2020.

In April 2017, Australia approved a single-supplier-limited Request for Tender (RFT) to Raytheon Australia to develop NASAMS for the ADF short-range ground-based air-defence system. On 20 June 2019, Kongsberg Defence & Aerospace AS (Norway) was awarded a US$185 million contract by Raytheon Australia for delivery of NASAMS components, while Raytheon Australia is the prime contractor to deliver NASAMS to the Australian Government Land 19 Phase 7B program. The Australian version of NASAMS GBAD will use locally made components, Defence minister Marise Payne announced first-pass approval on 10 April 2017. By September 2021, the first two Fire Distribution Centres for the Australian NASAMS had passed factory acceptance tests. By February 2022, the Mk2 canister for NASAMS launchers had been completed; it was planned to deliver three canister launchers in 2022.

In 2019, Qatar placed an order for AMRAAM-ER missiles as part of a NASAMS purchase.

On 1 July 2022, the United States through the Pentagon announced, as part of an $820 million military aid package to Ukraine, the delivery of NASAMS air defense systems through the Ukraine Security Assistance Initiative (USAI) during the 2022 Russian invasion of Ukraine. A US defence official said the existing Ukrainian air defense systems are Soviet-type systems, so over time it will be harder to sustain them. This is part of updating Ukrainian air defence from Soviet-era to a modern one. The systems being supplied may come from Norwegian stocks and may be retired units.

On 29 July 2022, the US DoD disclosed that it had started the formal process of acquiring two NASAMS batteries of 12 mobile launchers, each having six missiles, for Ukraine. On 24 August 2022, the US DoD announced that it would provide six additional NASAMS units "with additional munitions" to Ukraine under the Ukraine Security Assistance Initiative (USAI). The Pentagon said in late September 2022 that the NASAMS would start to be delivered in "two months or so".

The initial NASAMS batteries for Ukraine arrived in early November 2022. The Pentagon stated that NASAMS had a 100% success rate during the Russian missile strikes on 15 November 2022, and Ukrainian President Zelenskyy disclosed that the system shot down 10 missiles out of 10 targeted. The US government has been trying to obtain more NASAMS from the Middle Eastern countries as manufacturing a new system from scratch with the current production rates may take two years. According to Raytheon CEO Greg Hayes, the systems obtained from the Middle Eastern countries would later be replaced by the new ones. However, Mr Hayes denied that these Middle Eastern countries would have to wait 2 years to obtain new NASAMS: "Just because it takes 24 months to build, it doesn’t mean it’s going to take 24 months to get in [the] country."

Operators

NASAMS has been exported to the United States, with the NASAMS 2 upgrade having been exported to Finland, the Netherlands, Spain, Oman, and Chile.

There were 13 official operators as of September 2022. Kongsberg stated: "NASAMS is in operational use in Norway, Spain, USA, the Netherlands, Finland, Oman, Lithuania, Indonesia and
one undisclosed customer. The system is in production for Australia, Qatar, Hungary and Ukraine. NASAMS is in use with both Armies and Air Forces around the world. In addition Poland, Greece and Turkey operate the Kongsberg Command and Control solution for various weapon systems."

  – Contract for NASAMS-3 signed in March 2017, valued at A$2.5 billion. The system will be locally-assembled by Raytheon Australia and will replace RBS-70 systems in service. Australia received its first launchers in 2022.
  – Ordered in 2011.
  – Selected NASAMS-2 in 2009.
  – Two NASAMS-2 batteries delivered and in service as of 2020.
  – Two NASAMS-3 batteries delivered in 2020, each with four launchers as a part of a $128 million deal. As of mid-2022, Lithuania is in the process of acquiring more units.
  – Two batteries in 2006, each consisting of 1 fire-control center, 1 AN/MPQ-64M2 radar and 3 launchers, with a Hensoldt TRML-3D/32 search radar.
  — NASAMS-2 and NASAMS-3.
  – Ordered in January 2014, for a sum of $1.28 billion.
  – Four fire units NASAMS-2 acquired in 2003.
  – Ukraine announced they received the NASAMS system from the US in November 2022, and another procurement by Canada in January 2023.
  – Used with AN/TWQ-1 Avenger for additional protection to high-value targets and Washington D.C.

Future operators
  – Ordered in November 2020 in a $1b contract, with 60 pieces of AMRAAM C7/C8 missiles valued at $230M; planned delivery in 2023.
  – Ordered in July 2019. Qatar is the first country to procure AMRAAM-ER, the surface-to-air extended-range variant.

Potential operators
 : In 2018 India seriously considered acquiring NASAMS, but ultimately did not. The Indian Air Force said that it preferred to invest in the country's own multi-tiered Ballistic Missile Defense (BMD) program.
  and : In 2022, Latvia and Estonia signed a letter of intent on a joint purchase of medium-range air defense systems. Latvia was to work on the creation of a medium-range air defense system without delay.
 : Requested to buy 63 AIM-120C-8 Advanced Medium Range Air-to-Air Missiles (AMRAAM); 63 AIM-9X Sidewinder Block II tactical missiles; 12 Multifunctional Information Distribution Systems – Low Volume Terminal (MIDS LVT) Block Upgrade 2; and 12 MIDS LVT Cryptographic Modules. Approved by US State Department as Foreign Military Sale in October 2022.
  – The US government agreed to let Taiwan buy NASAMS air defense missile systems, during the annual Monterey Talks security meeting between both sides in Annapolis in June 2022. According to the news report, Taiwan will be allowed to buy the latest variant of NASAMS, which can fire AIM-9X, AMRAAM, and AMRAAM-ER missiles. Taiwan decided to purchase "more than four" NASAMS systems, following the US approval. The purchase will not be carried out until 2024, due to the demand on production capabilities for Ukraine.

See also
 CAMM
 HİSAR
 Multi-Mission Launcher
 Sky Dragon 50
 SPYDER
 VL MICA
 VL-SRSAM

References

External links 

Kongsberg.com NASAMS page
Royal Norwegian Air Force Air and Missile Defence Team Page 1
Royal Norwegian Air Force Air and Missile Defence Team Page 2
Royal Norwegian Air Force Home Page
NASAMS II (fact sheet in 
Finland acquire NASAMS and radar system for 500 million eur April 28, 2009

Kongsberg Gruppen
Military equipment introduced in the 1990s
Missile defense
Self-propelled anti-aircraft weapons of the United States
Surface-to-air missiles of Norway
Surface-to-air missiles of the United States
Weapons of Norway